Botafogo Futebol Clube, commonly referred to as Botafogo-SP, Botafogo de Ribeirão Preto or simply Botafogo, is a Brazilian association football club in Ribeirão Preto, São Paulo. They currently play in the Série B, the second tier of Brazilian football, as well as in the Campeonato Paulista Série A1, the top tier of the São Paulo state football league.

The club's home colours are red, white and black and the team mascot is a panther.

History 
In the beginning of the century, the city of Ribeirão Preto had at least three clubs: União, Paulistano Tiberense and Ideal Futebol Clube. In 1918, representatives of Ideal, proposed a merger of the clubs in the neighborhood. Besides the members of the boards of the three clubs, employees from the old Mogiana Railroad, and employees from the Antarctica Paulista Company participated in the meeting.

There was a consensus regarding the formation of a new club that would represent the neighborhood, but the choice of the name did not reach a conclusion. After a heated discussion, one member was quoted as saying: "Either you define the name or just 'put fire' (Bota Fogo) in everything and end this story ..." Because of what that member said, the club's name discussion had an unexpected conclusion. The threat of the incendiary leader ended up helping in the choice of name. The proposal was accepted, and in 1918 the club was named Botafogo Futebol Clube (contrary to popular belief, Botafogo of Ribeirão Preto was not inspired by Botafogo Football Club of Rio de Janeiro, defunct in 1942).

Botafogo's debut was in Franca, against local club Esporte Clube Fulgêncio. The match ended 1–0 in favor of the team from Ribeirão Preto. The first title of Botafogo was the São Paulo State Countryside Championship in 1927. In 1956, the club won the Ribeirão Preto Centennial Cup, beating Commercial in the final 4–2. Botafogo also won the Undefeated Cup after a series of 19 games unbeaten. In the same year, the team was also champion of the Second Division of the São Paulo State Championship.

In the year 1977, Botafogo won the São Paulo City Cup (first stage of the São Paulo State Championship), playing the final against São Paulo Futebol Clube, and beating the opponent team after normal time and overtime. The game ended 0-0 giving the title to Botafogo, as the club have done better a campaign in the competition.

In the 1990s, the club was runners-up twice, thus being promoted twice in the national league pyramid: the Série C in 1996, and Série B in 1998. In the following year, Botafogo was relegated and in 2000 competed in the Copa João Havelange, in the Yellow Module (equivalent to the Série B). In 2001, Botafogo was São Paulo State Championship's runners-up, an extraordinary achievement for a countryside club, playing in one of the most competitive leagues in the football world. In 2002,it was relegated again, this time to the Série C. Botafogo was relegated to the São Paulo State Championship Série A3 in 2005 because of problems fielding a player without registration with the Federação Paulista de Futebol, the famous "tapetão." In the following year, they won access to the São Paulo State Championship Série A2 after winning the Série A3.

In the 2018 edition, Botafogo finished 1st in Group B and achieved promotion to Campeonato Brasileiro Série B after defeating Botafogo-PB in the penalty shootout at the quarter-finals. They lost to Cuiabá in the next round, as all the semifinalist were already promoted.

Current squad

Stadium 

Botafogo de Riberião Preto's stadium is Estádio Santa Cruz, inaugurated in 1968, with a maximum capacity of 50,000 people.

Rival 
Botafogo de Ribeirão Preto's greatest rival is Comercial, which is also a Ribeirão Preto club. The derby between the two clubs is known as Come-Fogo.

Supporters 
 Botafogo is the most supported club in its region, with about three million inhabitants, and a proven 68% (survey conducted by Sports Brunoro in 1998). It has the third largest private stadium in Brazil, "Santa Cruz", and the thirty-seventh in the world with a capacity of 50,000 people.
 The club was the inspiration for the founding of the Botafogo of Cordinhã, Portugal in 1971. Besides adopting the name, the Portuguese club has a similar logo as Botafogo de Ribeirão Preto's and sport club Paulistinha city São Carlos, Brazil.
 The fan club, Fiel Força Tricolor (or FFT), founded in 1992, has one of the largest flags in Brazil, and the eighth largest in the world, measuring 135x33 meters, 90% painted. In 2008, the FFT participated in the carnival parade as a block of Ribeirão Preto, celebrating the 90th anniversary of the founding of Botafogo. The current president of the FFT is Andrew Trinity fans.
 In 2009, there is more of a fan club Botafogo FC Called Youth Force, the new group of fans will be present at all club games. Founded by former president of Tri Márcio True Terror Force, the Youth Force comes as a further incentive to the club, always striving for peace in stages.

Mascot 
The panther has as main features the strength and flexibility in the animal world. In the football field, Botafogo won the nickname "Pantera da Mogiana (Mogiana's Panther)" after beating clubs from that region of São Paulo state. They won the Campeonato do Interior in 1927, making justice to the club's nickname.

Achievements

State competitions 

Campeonato Paulista:
 Runners-up (1): 2001Campeonato Paulista do Interior: 12010Campeonato Paulista Série A2: 21927, 1956Campeonato Paulista Série A3: 12006Youth Campeonato Paulista: 41981, 1984, 1988, 1994

 Brazilian Championships Campeonato Brasileiro Série B:
 Runners-up (1): 1998Campeonato Brasileiro Série C:
 Runners-up (1): 1996Campeonato Brasileiro Série D: 1 2015

 International tournaments 
  Sesquicentenário da Argentina: 1972
  Torneio Internacional da Argentina: 4 times — 1962, 1969, 1971, 1972
  Liga Desportiva da Argentina: 1984
  Pentagonal of Guatemala: 1966
  Torneio Carmencita Granados in Costa Rica: 1984
  Copa Damian Castillo Duran in Costa Rica: 1982

 State tournaments 
  Taça dos Invictos: 1956 — 19 games unbeaten
  Vicente Feola: 1976
  Taça do Centenário de Ribeirão Preto: 1956

 Featured competitions 
  Campeonato Paulista  2001
  Brazilian Série C 1996
  Taça Cidade de São Paulo - 1977
  Brazilian Série B 1998

 CBF (Brazilian Football Confederation) Ranking 
 Position: 37th
 Points': 554 points (Ranking created by the Confederação Brasileira de Futebol, it awards points to clubs that participate in national competitions).''

Presidents

References

External links 
 
 The Come-Fogo derby

Botafogo Futebol Clube (SP)
Football clubs in São Paulo (state)
Association football clubs established in 1918
1918 establishments in Brazil
Campeonato Brasileiro Série D winners